Sherburne, New York is the name of two locations in Chenango County, New York:

Sherburne (town), New York
Sherburne (village), New York